Bodies may refer to:

 The plural of body
 Bodies (2004 TV series), BBC television programme
 Bodies (upcoming TV series), an upcoming British crime thriller limited series
 "Bodies" (Law & Order), 2003 episode of Law & Order
 Bodies: The Exhibition, exhibit showcasing dissected human bodies in cities across the globe
 Bodies (novel), 2002 novel by Jed Mercurio
 Bodies, 1977 play by James Saunders (playwright)
 Bodies, 2009 book by British psychoanalyst Susie Orbach

Music
 Bodies (album), a 2021 album by AFI
 Bodies (EP), a 2014 EP by Celia Pavey
 "Bodies" (Drowning Pool song), 2001 hard rock song by Drowning Pool
 "Bodies" (Sex Pistols song), 1977 punk rock song by the Sex Pistols
 "Bodies" (Little Birdy song), 2007 indie rock song by Little Birdy
 "Bodies" (Robbie Williams song), 2009 pop song by Robbie Williams
 "Bodies", a song by Megadeth from Endgame
 "Bodies", a song by The Smashing Pumpkins from Mellon Collie and the Infinite Sadness